Survivorman is a Canadian-produced television program, broadcast in Canada on the Outdoor Life Network (OLN), and internationally on Discovery Channel and Science Channel. The television series Survivorman consists of 8 seasons with a total of 51 episodes and 9 specials. The show originally aired on the Outdoor Life Network. It's unclear whether the dates of airing listed below are the Canadian or American dates or a mix depending on the season. The show debuted in Canada in 2004.

Season 6, which premiered in the US on 1 April 2015, is a break from the traditional series scenarios. It's focused on finding the mythical creature known as Bigfoot, rather than on outdoor survival odysseys as the name would otherwise imply.

Season 7 of Survivorman, which returned to the traditional format of lone survivor scenarios, premiered in the US on 7 November 2015, 10/9c PM.

Series overview

Episodes

Season 1 (2005)

Season 2 (2007)

Season 3 (2008)

Season 4 (2012)
Part of Survivorman 10 Days. This season is officially considered to be the fourth season of the show in the United States, despite airing on the Science Channel.

Season 5 (2014)
A new eight episode season of Survivorman was ordered for Travel + Escape in Canada, and either Discovery Channel or Science Channel in the United States. Two episodes feature Les' son, Logan, and the season is accompanied by two specials, Survivorman & Son and Survivorman Stalking Sasquatch on the Science Channel.

Season 6 (2015)
A new seven episode season of Survivorman has been ordered for Discovery Channel or Science Channel in the United States, and OLN in Canada.

Season 7 (2015)
The newest season begins on 7 November 2015 and airs on Discovery Channel or Science Channel in the United States, and Outdoor Life Network in Canada.

Season 8 (2016)

Specials

References

External links
 

Survivorman